João Francisco Pereira Fernandes (born 14 November 2000) is a Portuguese footballer who plays for Camacha, as a forward.

Football career
He made his professional debut for Nacional on 12 January 2020 in the LigaPro.

References

External links

2000 births
Sportspeople from Funchal
Living people
Portuguese footballers
Association football forwards
C.D. Nacional players
A.D. Camacha players
Liga Portugal 2 players
Campeonato de Portugal (league) players